The women's 15 kilometre mass start classical at the 2011 Asian Winter Games was held on February 6, 2011, at Biathlon and Cross-Country Ski Complex, Almaty.

Schedule
All times are Almaty Time (UTC+06:00)

Results

References

Results FIS

External links
Official website

Women 15